Scott Mitchell (born September 10, 1989) is a Canadian football offensive linemen who is currently a free agent. In the Canadian Football League’s Amateur Scouting Bureau final rankings, he was ranked as the best player for players eligible in the 2011 CFL Draft. He was then drafted second overall by the Edmonton Eskimos in the draft and signed with the team on May 31, 2011. After playing for three seasons with the Eskimos, he signed as a free agent with the Argonauts. He played college football with the Rice Owls.

His sister, Seanna, has represented Canada at several international swimming competitions and won a bronze medal as a member of its 4x100 freestyle relay.

References

External links
Toronto Argonauts bio

1989 births
Living people
Canadian football offensive linemen
Edmonton Elks players
Players of Canadian football from Ontario
Rice Owls football players
Canadian football people from Ottawa
Toronto Argonauts players